The 1994 UEFA European Under-16 Championship was the 12th edition of UEFA's European Under-16 Football Championship. Ireland hosted the championship, during April and May 1994. 16 teams entered the competition, and Turkey defeated Denmark in the final to win the competition for the first time.

Venues

Squads

Participants

Group stage

Group A

Group B

Group C

Group D

Knockout stage

Quarterfinals

Semifinals

Third Place Playoff

Final

References

RSSSF.com
UEFA.com

1994
UEFA
1994
1993–94 in Republic of Ireland association football
April 1994 sports events in Europe
May 1994 sports events in Europe
1994 in youth association football